George B. Hudnall was a Republican member of the Wisconsin State Senate.

Biography
Hudnall was born on January 9, 1864, in Rural, Wisconsin. He lived on a farm until he was 24 years old, when he began teaching and took up the study of law. He graduated from the University of Wisconsin Law School and practiced law in Superior, Wisconsin, and Milwaukee, Wisconsin. He died on October 1, 1936, at his home.

Political career
Hudnall was a member of the Senate from 1903 to 1911. Previously, he was City Attorney of Superior from 1900 to 1902. He was a Republican.

References

External links
 The Political Graveyard

People from Dayton, Waupaca County, Wisconsin
Politicians from Superior, Wisconsin
Politicians from Milwaukee
Republican Party Wisconsin state senators
Wisconsin lawyers
University of Wisconsin Law School alumni
1864 births
1936 deaths